The Venus of Martres is a sculpture fragment from an antique replica of the Aphrodite of Knidos. The replica was made around the first century of the common era. It is on display at Musée Saint-Raymond in Toulouse, France.

History 
The Venus of Martres was discovered in 1826 at Chiragan villa in Martres-Tolosane. It is currently on display on the first floor of Musée Saint-Raymond as exhibit Ra 52 (formerly Inv. 30328).

Description 
The Venus of Martres consists of a marble head in good general condition, although the tip of the nose is damaged. The shape of the neck indicates it might have been part of a bust or of a full-size statue. The hair is held in place by a ribbon that circles the head twice and shapes it into a bun. The face is slightly asymmetrical.

In his 1828 catalogue Alexandre Dumège identifies the fragment as representing Venus:

In 1865, Ernest Roschach instead identifies it to a depiction of Diana:

Notes and references

Exhibitions 
 Musées en balade, Musée archéologique d'Eauze, November–December 1997

Bibliography

External links 
 Notice de la Vénus de Martres sur le site du musée Saint-Raymond 
 

Marble sculptures
Roman copies of 4th-century BC Greek sculptures
Sculptures of Venus